757 Portlandia is a main-belt asteroid 32 km in diameter. It was discovered on 30 September 1908 from Taunton, Massachusetts by the amateur American astronomer Joel E. Metcalf. The asteroid was named for the city of Portland, Maine, where Hastings was a church minister at the time. In November 2015, amateur astronomers captured it with images of comet 67P/Churyumov–Gerasimenko. Portlandia came to opposition in March 2016 at apparent magnitude 13.2.

The orbital plane is inclined at an angle of 8.2° to the plane of the ecliptic. 757 Portlandia is classified as an X-type asteroid and is a core member of the proposed Athor asteroid family, named after 161 Athor. During 2003, the asteroid was observed occulting a star. The resulting chords were used to determine a diameter estimate of 36.7 km.

References

External links
 
 

Background asteroids
Portlandia
Portlandia
XF-type asteroids (Tholen)
Xk-type asteroids (SMASS)
19080930